Andrew Somerville RSA (1808–1834) was a short-lived Scottish artist. He is particularly noted for his illustration of Border ballads and several portraits.

Life

He was born in 1808 the son of Andrew Somerville, a wireworker on the Royal Mile in Edinburgh.

He was educated at the High School in Edinburgh, and then studied art at the Trustees Academy on Picardy Place, where he studied under William Simson.

He exhibited at the Royal Scottish Academy from 1830 and was elected an Associate in 1831 and a Fellow in 1833.

At the end of his life ‘’Andrew Somerville, portrait painter, Royal Academy’’ was listed as living at 4 James Square at the east end of Edinburgh's New Town. The property was demolished to build the St James Shopping Centre.

He died in Edinburgh in January 1834.

Family

He is thought to have been the nephew of David Somerville, engraver (f.1798-1825).

Known works
See 
Bride of Yarrow
Bonny Kilmeny (from a poem by James Hogg)
Donnybrook Fair
Cottage Children, (National Gallery of Scotland)
Flowers of the Forest (illustrating the Battle of Flodden), Scottish Art Union

References 

1808 births
1834 deaths
Artists from Edinburgh
People educated at the Royal High School, Edinburgh
Scottish artists